Ramkumar Verma (15 September 1905 – 15 October 1990) was a Hindi poet who published one act-plays and several anthologies of his work.

Life history
He was associated with the HBTU Kanpur. He belongs to Rajput community. He was born in the Sagar district of Central Provinces, British India, on 15 September 1905. He was known for his "Chhayavaad" style of writing.  He became noted for his one-act plays.  In 1930 his first one-act play "Badalon Ki Mrityu" was written, but he diversified into essays, novel and poetry.

Thematically
His work is mostly historical.  In his historical creations one can experience sacrifice, love, benevolence, forgiveness, service and humanity.  His morals have been influenced by Mahatma Gandhi.
His experience in theatre proved beneficial, when various of his works were published, like 'Reshmi Tai', 'Prithwiraj ki Aankhe', 'Kaumudi Mahotsav' and  'Deepdan', and the best is "nomaan ki bulundiya". and ''Raj Rani Sita''

Awards
He was awarded the Padma Bhushan in 1963 for his contributions in the category of "Literature and Education".

References

Hindi-language poets
University of Allahabad alumni
1905 births
1990 deaths
People from Sagar district
20th-century Indian poets
Recipients of the Padma Bhushan in literature & education
Indian male poets
Poets from Madhya Pradesh
20th-century Indian male writers